Half Angel may refer to:
 Half Angel (1951 film), a Technicolor comedy film
 Half Angel (1936 film), an American comedy film